Daimonoioannes or Eudaimonoioannes (Εὐδαιμονοϊωάννης) was the name of a noble Byzantine Greek family, or group of families, active in the 13th to 17th centuries. Particularly associated with Monemvasia, its members were also active in the wider Peloponnese, Kythira, and Crete, where they apparently moved  en masse in the 16th century, following the Ottoman capture of Monemvasia.

History
The family first appears, as Daimonoioannes, in the 1220s, in a speech by the Archbishop of Ohrid, Demetrios Chomatenos. The origin of the name is unknown; daimon means "demon", but may, according to Haris Kalligas, possibly refer to the site of Daimonia at Cape Maleas near Monemvasia. In the popular language, it became Daimonogiannes (Δαιμονογιάννης), as it is found in the Chronicle of the Morea, and variously Demonozaneus, Demonozannes, and de Mon[o]ianis in Western sources. It is only in the mid-14th century and after that the name acquired the form Eudaimonoiannes or Eudaimonogiannes with the addition of the prefix "eu-", "good", which henceforth became the standard form the family used.

From the outset the family were mostly associated with the fortress city of Monemvasia and the wider southern Peloponnese, while others were active in the island of Kythira off the Peloponnesian coast and in Venetian-ruled Crete, and a few as far afield as Venice itself, Serres, Constantinople, or the Kingdom of Naples. It is unclear whether all the bearers of the family name were members of the same family, and it has been suggested that there existed two closely related families with the same name, one in the Peloponnese and one in Crete. However, as the family first appears in the Peloponnese and Kythira, and only from the 16th century on occurs frequently in Crete (with 25 family members in the 16th century alone), it is more likely that the family moved to the island then, with the bulk of the family probably abandoning Monemvasia for Crete in 1545. The family also ruled Kythira, beginning perhaps as early as the 12th century, until 1238, when it passed to the Venetian House of Venier. The family remained active in the island thereafter, at least up to the mid-16th century.

Later scholars from the 16th to 18th centuries, linked the family to the last Byzantine imperial dynasty of the Palaiologoi. The 16th-century scholar Francesco Sansovino wrote that a certain John Palaiologos received the sobriquet "Eudaimonoioannes", i.e. "Fortunate John", for his exploits. He was followed by other notable historians like Du Cange and Girolamo Muzio, while the 18th-century writers Niccolò Comneno Papadopoli and Flaminius Cornelius recorded that the noted scholar Andreas Eudaimonoioannes descended from the Palaiologoi. In so far as can be determined by modern research, however, the two families were unrelated except for a single marriage; Sansovino's account may be a later invention by the family itself, as the form "Eudaimonoioannes" does not appear until near the middle of the 14th century. They did intermarry however with other noble families, as indicated by the occurrence of double surnames containing the family names Komnenos, Sarantenos, Notaras, Akatzas, Sophianos, and Komes alongside that of Daimonoioannes/Eudaimonoiannes.

Members
Note: Uncertain or erroneous family members are denoted in italics.

References

Sources
 
 

Daimonoioannes family
Greek noble families
Monemvasia
Kingdom of Candia
Kythira